

Walter Lichel (1 May 1885 – 10 December 1969) was a German general during World War II and recipient of the Knight's Cross of the Iron Cross of Nazi Germany. Lichel surrendered to the Allied troops in 1945 and was held until 1947.

Awards 

 Knight's Cross of the Iron Cross on 18 September 1941 as Generalleutnant and commander of 123. Infanterie-Division

References

Bibliography

 

1885 births
1969 deaths
German Army generals of World War II
Generals of Infantry (Wehrmacht)
Recipients of the Knight's Cross of the Iron Cross
People from Słupsk
German Army personnel of World War I
Recipients of the Iron Cross (1914), 1st class